Polyamory is a relationship orientation that is practiced by a minority of the population in the United States, about 4 to 5 percent. According to a 2016 study, 20 percent of singles in the US have attempted some form of consensual non-monogamy at some point of their lives, such as polyamory or open relationships. In a study, polyamorous couples tend to identify as bisexual and pansexual.

Acceptance
Polyamory is a subset of ethical non-monogamy (ENM), also known as consensual non-monogamy, in which one or more members in a relationship engage in a relationship with two or more people.  Individuals in polyamorous relationships are more likely to identify as bisexual or pansexual than heterosexual. A 2016 study showed that only half of all millennials want a completely monogamous relationship. One in 6 Americans find polyamory to be acceptable. Men 21% versus women 13% are more likely to accept polyamory lifestyle. Research conducted with more than 3,000 Americans found approximately 11% of the sample had been in a polyamorous relationship at some point in time. Polyamory is a growing group within the African American community.

Legal issues and legal recognition
In 1998, a Tennessee court granted guardianship of a child to her grandmother and step-grandfather after the child's mother April Divilbiss and partners outed themselves as polyamorous on MTV. After contesting the decision for two years, Divilbiss eventually agreed to relinquish her daughter, acknowledging that she was unable to adequately care for her child and that this, rather than her polyamory, had been the grandparents' real motivation in seeking custody.

In 2010, Ann Tweedy, a legal scholar, argued that polyamory could be considered a sexual orientation under existing United States law. This argument was opposed by Christian Keese, who wrote in 2016 that advocating a "sexual orientation model of polyamory is likely to reduce the complexity and transformative potential of poly intimacies," while also limiting reach and scope of possible litigation, obstruct the ability of poly activists to form alliances with other groups, and increase the possibility that poly activists will have to settle for legal solutions which are "exclusive and reproductive of a culture of privilege."

In 2016, writer Rebecca Ruth Gould called for non-monogamy, including polyamory, to receive "the legal recognition it deserves," saying that polyamory remains a "negative identity."

In 2017, three men became the first family in the state of California to have names of three dads "on their child’s birth certificate." In later years, they had legal challenges and in 2020 published a book about their experiences titled Three Dads and a Baby.

In June 2020, the city council of Somerville, Massachusetts voted to recognize polyamorous domestic partnerships in the city, becoming the first American city to do so. This measure was passed so that those in a polyamorous relationship would have access to their partners' health insurance, amid the COVID-19 pandemic.

In November 2020, the issue of polyamory came to the Supreme Court of Vermont in the form of a dispute between two men and a woman in a polyamorous relationship.

In March 2021, the Cambridge, Massachusetts City Council approved an ordinance amending the city's laws, stipulating that "a domestic partnership needn't only include two partners." The measure was supported by the Polyamory Legal Advocacy Coalition, also known as PLAC, composed of the Chosen Family Law Center, Harvard Law School LGBTQ+ Advocacy Clinic, and some members on the American Psychological Association's Committee on Consensual Non-Monogamy. This ordinance was originally proposed in July 2020. In April 2021, the adjacent town of Arlington, Massachusetts also approved domestic partnerships of more than two people, which was later approved by the state Attorney General's office.

References

 
Interpersonal relationships
Intimate relationships
Love
Sexual fidelity
Sexuality and society